The Chicago Film Critics Association Award for Best Adapted Screenplay is one of the annual awards given by the Chicago Film Critics Association.

Winners

2000s

2010s

2020s

References
 
 
 

Screenplay Adapted
Screenwriting awards for film